North Troy is a village in the town of Troy, Orleans County, Vermont, United States. The population was 631 at the 2020 census.

Government

Village Trustees are:
Mary Santaw
Jim Starr

History
There were Winter Carnivals from 1940 to 1942. In 1942, 4,000 people attended. There were dog sled races and ski jumping contests.

Until 2007, the village was unique for depending neither on the town constable nor the county sheriff for law enforcement but had a police force of its own. While it was not village policy to have fines as a money maker, the department did break even. It earned $39,070.12 in fines and other revenue in 2006.

Geography
According to the United States Census Bureau, the village has a total area of 1.9 square miles (5.0 km2), all land.

Demographics

As of the census of 2000, there were 593 people, 249 households, and 164 families residing in the village.  The population density was 305.7 people per square mile (118.0/km2).  There were 293 housing units at an average density of 151.0/sq mi (58.3/km2).  The racial makeup of the village was 98.65% White, 0.51% Native American, 0.34% Asian, and 0.51% from two or more races.

There were 249 households, out of which 29.7% had children under the age of 18 living with them, 48.6% were married couples living together, 11.2% had a female householder with no husband present, and 34.1% were non-families. 24.9% of all households were made up of individuals, and 11.6% had someone living alone who was 65 years of age or older.  The average household size was 2.38 and the average family size was 2.81.

In the village, the population was spread out, with 26.3% under the age of 18, 8.6% from 18 to 24, 25.5% from 25 to 44, 24.5% from 45 to 64, and 15.2% who were 65 years of age or older.  The median age was 37 years. For every 100 females, there were 97.7 males.  For every 100 females age 18 and over, there were 92.5 males.

The median income for a household in the village was $25,694, and the median income for a family was $31,042. Males had a median income of $26,765 versus $20,000 for females. The per capita income for the village was $13,291.  About 3.7% of families and 12.5% of the population were below the poverty line, including 9.0% of those under age 18 and 23.6% of those age 65 or over.

Notable people 

 Amasa Tracy, recipient of the Medal of Honor.
 Tom Velk, modern libertarian economist.

References

External links 

Incorporated villages in Vermont
 
Villages in Orleans County, Vermont